The Kłodnicki Canal is a canal along the Kłodnica River in Upper Silesia, Poland between the Oder River and Gliwice. Constructed when the territory was part of Prussian Silesia, it was originally known as the Klodnitz Canal.

Because the Kłodnica (Klodnitz) was not navigable, a canal was needed to provide transportation for the flourishing coal and ore mining, as well as the metallurgy industry in the Upper Silesia region. Designed by John Baildon, an engineer from Scotland and Friedrich Wilhelm von Reden, Director of the High Mining Office in Breslau (Wrocław), the canal was built between 1792 and 1812. It incorporated two hybrid inclined track/ canal locks. 

The depth of the canal and the design of the locks allowed the use of vessels of up to 50 tons of payload. However, construction of rail transport facilities connecting the Upper Silesian coalfields eroded the importance of the waterway. The freight volume on the canal in 1847 was 70,000 tons, but shipments dropped to only 4,400 tons by 1865. Between 1888 and 1893, the canal was expanded to allow the passage of vessels up to 100 tons load and  draft. However the waterway did not regain its importance.

The Klodnitz Canal facility was replaced by the Gleiwitz (Gliwice) Canal, built from 1935-1939. The territory became part of Poland in 1945 after World War II.

References

Notes

External links
 Szymonowicz, Jarosław "A Scotsman in Silesia" Warsaw Voice, 28 March 2007, retrieved on October 16, 2007.
 The history of the "Królowa Luiza" mine in Zabrze, retrieved on October 16, 2007.
 Pounds, Norman J. G. "The Industrial Geography of Modern Poland". Economic Geography, Vol. 36, No. 3 (Jul., 1960), pp. 231–253.

18th-century establishments in Poland
Canals in Poland
Buildings and structures in Silesian Voivodeship
Canals opened in 1812